Sammi(in Punjabi سمی )  is a Pakistani television drama serial about social causes that airs on Hum TV from 28 January 2017. It is written by Noor ul Huda Shah and directed by Saife Hassan. Set in rural Rahim Yar Khan, the series centers social issues on the rural society revolving around the concept of Vanni and shows moral lessons against common issues such as gender discrimination. Depicting the Vanni concept, storyline revolves around the journey of Sammi, a young girl who was sold off by her family to the Chaudhry family where her brother had killed her fiancé. Simultaneously it revolves around reality based issues with different characters within the same plot. It was nominated for Best Drama Serial at the 6th Hum Awards.

The series stars Mawra Hocane as Sammi, Adnan Siddiqui as Rashid Chand, Rehan Sheikh as Chaudhry Rab Nawaz, Sania Saeed as Chandni, Bilal Khan as Aaliyan, Ahad Raza Mir as Salar, Saman Ansari as Salima, Madiha Rizvi as Zulekha Chaudhry and Nadia Afghan as Naheed.

It was co-created and co-produced by the creative head Momina Duraid with Johns Hopkins University Center for Communication Programs. The show was first aired on Hum TV, as a part of night programming all under Duraid's production company.

Plot
The Series takes place in the village Rahim Yar Khan with the story of a young educated girl Sammi Jutt who is marrying Pervaiz Chaudhry. On the day of her Nikkah, her brother, Waqas, demands extra payment for their Mahr Payment, (a promised amount of money paid by the groom), from Pervaiz. This leads to a physical altercation between them in which Waqas kills Pervaiz in anger. 
After the cancellation of wedding,  Pervaiz's father Fazal insists his younger brother, Rab Nawaz (a political leader and feudal lord of the Rahimabad area of district Rahim Yar Khan), get justice by ordering Waqas killed. However, Sammi's parents beg Rab Nawaz for their son's life and offered their daughter as a Vanni, (selling her off for the sake of their son). Rab Nawaz accepts to their offer and announces Sammi as a Vanni to the entire village. To save Sammi's future, Fazal denies accepting her as Vanni, which leads to chaos. Villagers turn against Rab Nawaz, who decides to wed Sammi off to his twelve-year-old son in order to gain a higher reputation with the village

Since the village has never sought police or law for justice, everyone assists Rab Nawaz. A nerveless Fazal remains silent while Sammi is kept as a captive in Chaudhry's Haveli.

The series also depicts Rashid Chand's family. Rashid is Rab Nawaz's respected servant since his mother Zarina remained his Milk kinship. Zarina and Rashid consider themselves Rab Nawaz's slaves over generations.

Salima, Rashid's wife, receives constant criticism from her mother-in-law because of failed attempts to have a son, resulting in five daughters. This parodies the illiteracy village series and gender discrimination, where woman are blamed for giving birth to daughters.

The series takes a turn when, Zulekha Chaudhry, Rab Nawaz's wife, fears her son's future and asks Rashid to escape with Sammi from the village. Rashid helps Sammi escape from Rahim Yar Khan and sends her to Karachi to live with Chandni, who was once Rashid's fiancé. In order for Sammi to stay, Chandni tells her to work in her beauty salon. Over time, Sammi gains respect in Chandni's Saloon and Salar (Chandni's Son) begins to develop feelings for her. On the other hand, Salima loses her unborn child and befriends Naheed, her nurse, who is also the victim of gender discrimination. Her brother and sister-in-law took over all the property after their parent's death and forced her to work, taking her salary. During Salima's monthly checkups, Zarina decides to take Rashid's proposal to Naheed's brother.

The story includes Aaliyan, Naheed's nephew, who happens to be Salar's best friend. Naheed has a relationship with Ghulam Rasool, who received criticism from the entire society since he was an illegal child of the parents had committed suicide after his birth. When he brings Naheed's marriage proposal, he is insulted and sent back. Looking to this Naheed decides to secretly marry him. Story takes another turn when Aaliyan is approached to tuition Rab Nawaz's son and Naheed finally marries Ghulam Rasool secretly, she decides return home and reveal the truth after few weeks, after reaching home she finds out that her marriage has been fixed with Rashid Chand. On the other hand, Salar decides to marry Sammi for her protection to which Sammi rejects his offer for marriage, the entire conversation is heard by Chandni who throws Sammi out from her house the next day. Sammi decides to return to Rahim Yar Khan but is stopped by Salar who then gives her shelter in a separate house and begins his Nikkah ceremony to which denies. Where as on the other side, Rab Nawaz finds out about Sammi's escape through Waqas and punished Rashid, where as Zarina is forced to remain silent by Zulekha since she is the only one who knows about her involvement. Salar lies to his mother that he has married Sammi to which she furiously contacts Waqas and reveals him about Sammi's whereabouts. Waqas comes to the house she is in and takes Sammi. Salar tries to find her but dies in a car accident. Waqas tries to burn Sammi in front of the village But Rab Nawaz brings Sammi back to his haveli. He declares that he will marry Sammi. Chandni learns of Salar's death and comes to Rahim Yar Khan. Sammi also finds out that Salar is dead from Aaliyan (whom Chandni told). In the last episode, the higher and respected personality of the village "Peer sahib" (and most sensible one) decides to hand over Waqas to police and free Sammi from the bond of "Vanni". Chandni marries Sammi to Aaliyan and as Rashid takes her to a station Chandni dies. The drama ends with Sammi smiling at Aaliyan.

Cast 
 Mawra Hocane as Sammi Jutt
 Sania Saeed as Chandi(dead)
 Adnan Siddiqui as Rashid
 Rehan Sheikh as Chaudhry Rab Nawaz
 Saman Ansari as Salima
 Bilal Khan as Aaliyan
 Nadia Afgan as Naheed
 Ahad Raza Mir as Salaar
 Seemi Raheel as Zarina
 Madiha Rizvi as Zulekha Chaudhry
 Haris Waheed as Waqas Jutt
 Irfan Khoosat as Riaz Jutt
 Humaira Ali as Nargis Jutt
 Noor ul Hassan as Fazal-ud-din Jamaluddin (Ba Fazal)
 Kinza Malik as Bilquis
 Beena Chaudhary as Naheed's sister-in-law
 Malik Raza as Naheed's brother

Guest Appearance 
 Mirza Zain Baig as Pervaiz (Dead)

Production

Development
Sammi was developed by Hum TV's senior producer Momina Duraid of MD Productions, and the CEO of the channel Sultana Siddiqui. In late 2016, the channel announced that it will be bringing a TV series similar to Udaari which would be made on noble cause. The senior developer Sultana Siddiqui announced that Sammi was made to address social issues, commenting on its storyline Siddiqui states "It showed the dark but real side of our society ...... Staying away from glamour we have tried to present a story that needs our attention" commenting on the same topic, Duraid comments   "Entertainment with a purpose is what we need to educate the masses". The channel hired the award-winning director Saife Hassan to direct the series.The Story of the series was Written by Noor-ul-Huda Shah Story of serial is written by Noor-ul-Huda Shah, speaking about her screenplay Shah says "It’s an inspiration from my initial works such as Jungle and Marvi." Further more on the series press conference, she states that "My message is for those brothers who consider their sisters as their property and deprived them of their basic rights".

Song composition is done by Sahir Ali Bagga who previously composed Sajna ve Sajna for channel's 2016 series Udaari. while background music is given by MAD Music. Zaheer Abbas and vocalist Zeb Bangash were finalised to perform the soundtrack.  For Bangash, it marks her return to Hum TV after she sang Yar-e-Maan from the 2015 series Diyar-e-Dil.

Casting

Casting of the series began during the filming of TV series Udaari, producer Momina Duraid, director Saife Hasan and writer Noor-ul-Huda Shah mutually chose the cast which includes Mawra Hocane, Adnan Siddiqui, Rehan Sheikh, Sania Saeed, Bilal Khan, Ahad Raza Mir, Saman Ansari, Madiha Rizvi Nadia Afghan to portray the leading roles. Mawra Hocane made her television comeback after 2014 and her Bollywood debut film Sanam Teri Kasam, previously she was finalised to portray the role of Nida Nafees alongside Adnan Malik in channel's series Gypsy, but in mid 2016 its title was changed to Dil Banjaara and it was finalised that actress Sanam Saeed will replace Hocane in Dil Banjaara since Hocane was finalised for Sammi. Talking about her role Hocane states, "While studying at good colleges and travelling abroad we often forget about girls suffering in the villages, if Sammi gives only one percent hope to girls then I am ready to do ten more shows like it to fix this problem." The actress made her second appearance together with Adnan Siddiqui who was finalised to portray the role of Rashid Chand for the series after his success in previous roles. He joined the series after completing his 2016 series Pakeeza for the same channel. The actor receives appraisal for his role of depicting the culture of rural region. Alongside Siddiqui, actress Saman Ansari was finalised to portray the role of Salima, Rashid Chand's wife who depicted the role of a helpless woman surviving in illiterate society. Sania Saeed was cast to portray the role of Chandni after her performance in the 2016 series Sang-e-Mar Mar.

Actors such as Rehan Sheikh, Seemi Raheel, Irfan Khoosat and Malik Raza were also cast. Sheikh was cast for the role of Chaudhry Rab Nawaz .  Raheel was finalised to portray the role of Zarina where she portrayed a Punjabi villager. It was her return to Hum TV after the 2013 series Durr-e-Shahwar. Khoosat was finalised to play the role of Riaz Jutt, alongside him Haris Waheed was finalised to portray Waqar Jutt. Malik Riaz was also cast in the series where he portrayed the role of Aaliyan's father.

Ahad Raza Mir (son of actor Asif Raza Mir) and Pakistani singer Bilal Khan made their television debut with Mir portrayed the role of Salar and Khan portrayed Aaliyan. Nadia Afghan was finalised for the role of Naheed, the actress was given a leading role and was introduced in the fourth episode of the series. Similarly Madiha Rizvi was selected for Zulekha Chaudhry, Rab Nawaz's wife.

Music

The title song of Sammi was composed by musician Sahir Ali Baaga, lyrics for the song were given by Major Imran Raza, background score for the series is done by Mad Music. The OST was performed by Zeb Bangash with Zaheer Abbas being in the chorus. It marks her Return, since she performed the channels hit drama series Diyar-e-Dils title song "Yar-e-Man" in 2015. The first half of the soundtrack was released on 27 January 2017. The soundtrack was produced along with series production by Momina Duraid

Track listing

Release

Broadcast
Sammi was released on 27 January 2017 on Hum TV, with its release it was given the Sundays 8:00pm slot which was maintained by their similar series Udaari and bout a higher viewership to the channel, Sammi replaced Bin Roye which had replaced Udaari in October 2016 but received below average ratings which had its time slot dominated to rival channels. The channel aired a weekly episode for approximately 30–45 minutes (without commercials).. It was aired on Hum Europe in UK, on Hum TV USA in USA and Hum TV Mena on UAE, with same timings and 3 February 2017 being the premier date.

Home media and digital release
The show was uploaded on YouTube alongside its airing on television but later the channel deleted all its episodes. It was also released on the iflix app as a part of channel's contract with the app but later on, on terminating the contract in 2019, all the episodes were pulled off and thus had no digital availability to stream. Moreover, it was also released on the MX Player app. In July 2019, the channel reuploaded all its episodes with muted music.

Reception
After the series premier, the pilot episode was lauded and praised by several critics, writing for HIP in Pakistan Saira Khan praised the director and the writer for producing a screenplay with heavy storyline and poignant cast. Khan praises Hocane and Sidiqui's characters and compares the series with 2016 serial Udaari, she concluded her issue praising its casting and story line. Similarly, Ghazala Suleiman writing for Brandsynario praised the series premiere episode. Fatima Awan writing for Review It moderately reviewed the premier. The premiere episode was also praised by Mariam Shafique who writes for Express Tribune, in her editorial Shafique praised the bold issues being highlighted in the series and the way writer penned down several events within an episode, Shafique discusses several realities of society and compares it with several shows depicting it. Furthermore, she praised all the characters and their parody of rural citizens. Moreover, Writing for Dawn News, Sadaf Haider moderately reviewed the series. Furthermore, on her same issue, Haider praises Sammi's characters.

In March 2017 Sammi received positive reviews from several news articles. Saira Khan praised the series and its storyline in her Hip issue, she even praises Saife Hassan's direction skills and casting by considering Sammi's each episode a gripping one. In the same month the series introduced its lead protagonists where HIP praised Bilal Khan and Ahad Raza Mir's entry. Series plot was discussed the most and it was added that with each episode characters engage more and more audience, once again the screen play also received appraisal.  Moreover, on the same review Khan praised Ahad Raza Mir and Bilal Khan's approach to their role. Apart from the male leads Nadia Afghan was also lauded for her portrayal of Naheed, Khan praises her role and skills.

The character of Rashid (portrayed by Adnan Siddiqui) received critical appraisal from critics. HIP Pakistan praised Siddiqui's portrayal of Rashid in one of their issues. Simultaneously the character of Salima opposite to Siddiqui (portrayed by Saman Ansari) also received appraisal from the critics, commenting on her onscreen pairing with Siddiqui. In several issues and articles Mawra Hocane, Ahad Raza Mir, and Bilal Khan also received public attention and appraisal from the critics. The series has also received praise for its storyline, direction and cinematography.

Awards and nominations

See also 
 List of programs broadcast by Hum TV
2017 in Pakistani television

References

External links 
 Hum TV Website

Pakistani drama television series
2017 Pakistani television series debuts
2017 Pakistani television series endings
Urdu-language television shows
Television series set in Punjab, Pakistan
Hum TV original programming